James A. Beckel Jr. (born 1948) is a contemporary American composer and, as of 2012, principal trombonist of the Indianapolis Symphony Orchestra. His compositions have been performed and recorded by the Baltimore, Atlanta, Indianapolis Symphonies, Ft. Wayne Philharmonic, United States Air Force Band, the DC Air Force Orchestra, and many other nationally-recognized orchestras throughout the United States.

Beckel is married, has two children, and is a member of the Carmel Brass Choir.  Beckel maintains a trombone and euphonium studio at DePauw University in Greencastle, Indiana.

Biography

Beckel was born in Marion, Ohio, where he studied with the trombonist Irey Halt.  A diligent pupil, Beckel would often practice late into the evening, only to get up early and finish his homework.  He wanted to become an orchestral trombonist, so he wrote Edward Kleinhammer, then the bass trombonist of the Chicago Symphony Orchestra.  Kleinhammer suggested, simply, that Beckel practice not two hours a day (as Beckel had done), but four hours a day.

Beckel attended Indiana University, where he studied with Lewis Van Haney.  He won the position as principal trombone in Indianapolis in 1969, at a mere 20 years old of age.

Style and Compositional Development

As early as high school Beckel was composing and earning awards, the first a national award at North Texas State for one of his big band competitions.  Having taken piano lessons alongside trombone lessons throughout grade school, Beckel improvised greatly using the piano Always fascinated with chords and harmonies, Beckel’s compositional style grew out of the American jazz culture at the time, especially Dave Brubeck.

From the jazz perspective of form, the harmonic progression is key and the melody is an elaboration of the harmonic.  However, after joining the Indianapolis Symphony Orchestra and beginning close study of orchestral repertoire, Beckel began a new chapter in his compositional process.  From the symphonic perspective, melody is the first item considered.  Most often the case, especially when considering music of the Baroque, counterpoint is a consequence of the melody.  In Beckel’s own words, a melodic approach, “...takes you to larger rooms....The music product is better when heard horizontally.”

With the Indianapolis Symphony

Similar to the lock-out of the Indianapolis Symphony in 2012, one of the most pivotal points in the symphony’s history began during the 1971-72 season.  The work stoppage was nearly identical, teetering on whether to reduce the orchestra to a part-time entity or flourish into a full-time, world-class symphony.  Resolved by the help of then Indianapolis Major Richard Lugar, one of the biggest components of helping the symphony, the consensus was to put together a board interested in allowing and helping the symphony grow.  Headed by Bill Weisel, the symphony got bigger and better, growing into today’s full-time, 52-week orchestra.

The first piece Beckel wrote for the ISO was Three Sketches for Orchestra, a jazz-based, rhythm-section-inclusive piece that "funnels down" to a trombone concerto.  While well received, Beckel quickly learned of imminent issues: most pops orchestra directors balk at needing to hire a rhythm section to play the piece, and most classical trombonists don’t improvise.  Later, Celebrations, written for the birth of Beckel’s son, was the beginning of gravitating to writing more concert music than jazz.

Beckel’s first true non-jazz composition was Night Visions.  Erich Kunzel, the long-time Cincinnati Pops Orchestra director, appreciated Night Visions, but it was too long and too serious for a pops audience.  Beckel was up against a similar wall in the symphonic world: Night Visions was not "serious enough" for an orchestral environment.  Beckel unintentionally learned how marketing and composition can be large influences that determine performing opportunities.

Unexpectedly, the last movement of Night Visions, “The American Dream”, stood out commercially as a stand-alone work.  Hal Leonard Publishing Company contacted Beckel to sell the piece, and  ‘’The American Dream’’ became the first of Beckel’s compositions published by Hal Leonard.

Kent Leslie, a French horn player, approached Beckel to write a horn concerto.  Leslie gave Beckel Hermann Hesse’s The Glass Bead Game as material for writing the concerto, inadvertently making a mark in Beckel’s compositional process.  Developing a composition from a primary source, using direct material to draw from, was a new approach for Beckel. "I write music best when it means something, rather than just sounds."

The concerto The Glass Bead Game, according to Hal Leonard’s reports in 2011 – despite their initial trepidation – the numbers of sold copies exceeds 800, and in a second printing!  For a college-level horn concerto and the positive reviews from professors and performers alike, The Glass Bead Game is considered a standard in horn repertoire, beside that of the Mozart and Strauss horn concertos.

One of Beckel’s most performed compositions, Liberty for All, has been performed by at least 80 orchestras with hundreds of performances.  With the success of his patriotic compositions, Lt. Col. Alan Sierichs, United States Air Force Band commander, commissioned Beckel to write another piece;  Gardens of Stone was the product of that commission, paying tribute to fallen soldiers.  Mark Weaver, former principal trombone with the Coast Guard Band, was a huge help in developing I Am the American Flag.  The work takes inspiration from the ceremony that surrounds the retirement of a member of the Coast Guard, where an American flag is passed to each member and he retells stories that pertain to the retiring member.

After so many commissions that were patriotic-heavy, Beckel was on way to becoming pigeon-holed as a patriotic composer.  Mario Venzago, an influential mentor to Beckel, commissioned him to write Fantasy after Schubert.  Pleased with the product, Toccata for Orchestra came out of another commission by Venzago.  One of the biggest works written in Beckel’s repertoire that was not programmatic, Toccata was music written "for music’s sake."  The last work commissioned by Venzago and composed by Beckel was a Konzertstück, In the Mind’s Eye, a Concerto for Horn Section and Orchestra.  Written specifically for the horn section of the Indianapolis Symphony in mind, the composition was debuted in May 2010.  With disputes between management and Venzago, the former director was never able to conduct the work with the Indianapolis Symphony Orchestra.

Compositional Process

Constantly learning, Beckel always maintains a list of "what works/what never to do again."  He is quoted saying, "Your first impressions are often your best ideas."  Objectivity does very often become an issue, so Beckel finishes a piece and sets it aside, only to come back later to revisit with a clear perspective.  On one such event, he took the work off the shelf after a month, only to throw it in the garbage can and start over.  As Beckel matures, he "trusts himself more," attempting to write every piece better, and to allow himself to be creative.  "I still believe in melody," Beckel states.  Not a subscriber of sweeping waves of emotion, Beckel is rooted in a traditional approach to form and melody.  "Yet at the same time, [I] hopefully surprise sometimes."

Note: the entirety of this article is based upon an interview with James A. Beckel Jr., on October 25, 2012.

Works List
Toccata for Orchestra
In the Mind’s Eye 
Glass Bead Game
Fantasy after Schubert
Liberty for All
American Dream
Gardens of Stone
A Christmas Fanfare
Symphony for Band
I Am the American Flag
Waltz of the Animals
Night Visions
Musica Mobilis
A Gospel Christmas
Inaugural Fanfare
Overture for a New Age
Make a Joyful Noise
Celebrations
Portraits
Musical Masque (for the Seasons)
Music for Winds, Piano, and Percussion
Imagination
Sonata for Trumpet and Organ
American Journey
String Quartet No. 1
Concerto for Tuba and Percussion
Lament for Two Trombones
Primitive Modern
Lost Dreams and Rainy Days
Three Sketches for Orchestra
Christmas Medley for Brass Septet
Amazing Grace
Freedom’s Hope
The Long Dream
Intrada
They’re Playing our Song

References

External links
Beckel, James A., Kent L. Leslie, Thomas Harvey, Sheryll McManus, Wendy Muston, Tom Akins, Kirk Trevor, and Lewis J. Buckley. Musica mobilis music for brass. Indianapolis, IN: WMG. CD. 2001. 
Beckel Jr., James. A. “James A. Beckel Jr., Composer.” InstantEncore. http://www.instantencore.com/contributor/contributor.aspx?CId=5001312 (accessed October 8, 2012). 
Beckel, Jim, and Sheryll McManus. The Glass Bead Game: Concerto for Horn and Orchestra. Milwaukee, WI. H. Leonard Corp. CD. 2001. 
Beckel, Jim, and Sylvia Patterson-Scott. In the Mind's Eye: Images for Horns and Orchestra. Milwaukee, WI: Hal Leonard Corp, 2010. 
Berns, Paul. “Orchestra Librarians – the answer – the Jim Beckel premier.” Blog by the Indianapolis Symphony Orchestra. https://archive.today/20131004051054/http://blog.indianapolissymphony.org/blog/the-word-cool/orchestra-librarians-the-answer-the-jim-beckel-premier (accessed October 8, 2012). 
Layendecker, Dennis M. Holiday Traditions. USAF Symphony Orchestra and Singing Sergeants. Altissimo Records. CD. 2007. 
Menkhaus, Renée. "In the Mind's Eye: A Konzertstück for the New Millennium." Horn Call: Journal of the International Horn Society 41, no. 1 (October 2010): 108. Music Index, EBSCOhost (accessed October 7, 2012). 
Paré, Craig. Airs and Dances. DePauw University Band. Mark Custom Recording Service: CD. 2000. 
Paré, Craig. Starsplitter. DePauw University Band. Mark Custom Recording Service. CD. 2008. 
Patterson, Merlin. "Beckel The Glass Bead Game, McAllister Black Dog, Maslanka Trombone Concerto." Fanfare: The Magazine For Serious Record Collectors 35, no. 2 (November 2011): 343-344. Music Index, EBSCOhost (accessed October 7, 2012). 
Ritter, Steven. “Perspectives: Sound & Rhythm." Fanfare: The Magazine For Serious Record Collectors 30, no. 5 (May 2007): 266-267. Music Index, EBSCOhost (accessed October 7, 2012).

1948 births
Living people
American male composers
21st-century American composers
21st-century American male musicians